This list includes revolutionary organizations aimed at liberating and unifying Albanian-inhabited territories into a national state of Albania.

Established before declaration of independence:
League of Prizren (05 January 1877 – April 1881), founded by Ottoman Albanian beys
League of Peja (1899–1900), founded by former League of Prizren members
Black Society for Salvation (1909–1912)

Established after declaration:
Committee for the National Defence of Kosovo (de facto founded May 1915, de jure 01 May 1918 – 1933; 1936), founded by political exiles from Kosovo

See also
Albanian National Awakening
Albanian Vilayet
Cheta (armed group)

References